The 1964 Wichita State Shockers football team was an American football team that represented Wichita State University as a member of the Missouri Valley Conference during the 1964 NCAA University Division football season. In its third and final season under head coach Marcelino Huerta, the team compiled a 4–6 record (2–2 against conference opponents), finished third out of five teams in the MVC, and was outscored by a total of 197 to 112. The team played its home games at Veterans Field, now known as Cessna Stadium.

Schedule

References

Wichita State
Wichita State Shockers football seasons
Wichita State Shockers football